Oakfield is a community of the Halifax Regional Municipality in the Canadian province of Nova Scotia.  The community was founded and named by John Wimburn Laurie. He built St. Margaret's of Scotland Church and is the namesake of Laurie Park. He arrived in Canada in 1861. In 1865 he purchased 800 acres in Oakfield. He brought twenty families from England.

Parks
Laurie Provincial Park 
Oakfield Provincial Park

References

 "Oakfield and its Founder Col. John Wimburn Laurie"; by Miss Margaret Laurie; Collections of the Nova Scotia Historical Society. Vol #24 (1938); pp. 15.
 Explore HRM

Communities in Halifax, Nova Scotia
General Service Areas in Nova Scotia
1865 establishments in Canada